John Boxer (25 April 1909 – 22 August 1982) was a British film and television actor. His 
television appearances included Emergency – Ward 10, Dixon of Dock Green, The Saint, Randall and Hopkirk (Deceased), The Onedin Line and The Life and Times of David Lloyd George.

Selected filmography

 Escape Me Never (1935) - Undetermined Role (uncredited)
 There Ain't No Justice (1939) - Mr. Short (uncredited)
 Convoy (1940) - German Captain (uncredited)
 George and Margaret (1940) - Claude
 The Black Sheep of Whitehall (1942) - Hotel Receptionist (uncredited)
 The Big Blockade (1942) - Press
 The Day Will Dawn (1942) - U-Boat Commander
 Flying Fortress (1942) - Meteorologist (uncredited)
 The Foreman Went to France (1942) - Official (uncredited)
 The Goose Steps Out (1942) - British Pilot (uncredited)
 In Which We Serve (1942) - Hollet
 The Life and Death of Colonel Blimp (1943) - Soldier (uncredited)
 The Flemish Farm (1943) - Cyclist (uncredited)
 Millions Like Us (1943) - Tom
 The Demi-Paradise (1943) - British sailor
 San Demetrio London (1943) - Naval Officer (uncredited)
 The Halfway House (1944) - The Doctor
 Tawny Pipit (1944) - Soldier On Manoeuvre (uncredited)
 The Way Ahead (1944) - Soldier in Pub Talking to the Chelsea Pensioners (uncredited)
 Waterloo Road (1945) - Policeman in Fight in Arcade (uncredited)
 The October Man (1947) - Det. Sgt. Troth
 The White Unicorn (1947) - Bill (uncredited)
 Take My Life (1947) - Policeman Making Charge Statement (uncredited)
 My Brother's Keeper (1948) - Police Sgt. Bert Foreman
 London Belongs to Me (1948) - Prison Officer (uncredited)
 Feature Story (1949)
 The Blue Lagoon (1949) - Nick Cobbert
 It's Not Cricket (1949) - MP #1
 Man on the Run (1949) - Radio Control Officer
 Stop Press Girl (1949) - Pub Landlord (uncredited)
 Marry Me! (1949) - Policeman (uncredited)
 Don't Ever Leave Me (1949) - Policeman at Pillar Box (uncredited)
 Madeleine (1950) - Plainclothes Policeman (uncredited)
 Waterfront (1950) - Policeman (uncredited)
 The Woman in Question (1950) - Detective Lucas (uncredited)
 The Clouded Yellow (1950) - Keswick Police Sgt (uncredited)
 Highly Dangerous (1950) - Police Sergeant at Customs Cafe (uncredited)
 Mister Drake's Duck (1951) - Sergeant
 Pool of London (1951) - Detective in Pub (uncredited)
 Laughter in Paradise (1951) - Const. Charles Baker (uncredited)
 High Treason (1951) - Ships Radio Operator (uncredited)
 One Stop Shop (1953) - Bob Selby
 Street Corner (1953) - Policeman Outside Jewellers (uncredited)
 The Red Beret (1953) - Flight Sgt. Box
 Meet Mr. Lucifer (1953) - Accountant in Office (uncredited)
 Diplomatic Passport (1954) - Policeman (uncredited)
 The Ship That Died of Shame (1955) - Customes Man (uncredited)
 Secret Venture (1955) - Inspector Dalton
 Brothers in Law (1957) - Mr. Johnson
 The Tommy Steele Story (1957) - Paul Lincoln
 The Bridge on the River Kwai (1957) - Major Hughes
 Undercover Girl (1958) - Ken Farrell, the Editor
 Heart of a Child (1958) - Breuer
 Violent Moment (1959) - Det. Sgt. Jarman (uncredited)
 Victim (1961) - Policeman in Cell (uncredited)
 Emergency (1962) - Prison Governor
 Hide and Seek (1964) - Secretary at Ministry
 For the Love of Ada (1972) - Vicar
 Frenzy (1972) - Sir George
 Gandhi (1982) - Court Reporter #2 (final film role)

References

External links

1909 births
1982 deaths
English male film actors
English male television actors
People from Hackney Central
Male actors from London
20th-century English male actors